Marçay may refer to the following places in France:

 Marçay, Indre-et-Loire, a commune in the Indre-et-Loire department
 Marçay, Vienne, a commune in the Vienne department